NYSTA may refer to:
New York Singing Teachers' Association
New York State Teachers Association
New York State Thruway Authority